Delane C. Kritsky is an American parasitologist who specialised on the Monogenea, a class of parasitic flatworms which are important ectoparasites of fishes. His research was mainly in the fields of taxonomy, faunistics, and phylogeny of the Monogenea.

He is one of the most prolific author in the field of systematics of Monogenea, with hundreds of species described, and has co-authored a major, highly cited revision of the Monogenea in 1993.

Career

Delane C. Kritsky earned his PhD degree in zoology from the University of Illinois Urbana-Champaign in 1971. He had his whole career in Idaho State University where he began in 1974 as an assistant professor, and became a full professor in 1983. He has been an administrator for much of his career: from 1979 to 1989 he was the chair of the Department of Allied Health Professions, was  acting dean in 1985–1986, and associate dean from 1989 until his retirement. He is still (2018) Emeritus Professor in Idaho State University.
He is a member of the editorial board of several journals of parasitology, including Zoologia and Systematic Parasitology.

Eponymous taxa
The digenean genus Kritsky Orélis-Ribeiro  and Bullard, 2016  and the monogenean genus Kritskyia Kohn, 1990  were named in his honour. Several species of monogeneans were named in his honour, such as Bravohollisia kritskyi Lim, 1995, Dactylogyrus kritskyi Mizelle & McDougal 1970, Protogyrodactylus kritskyi Boeger, Diamanka, Pariselle & Patella 2012, Pseudorhabdosynochus kritskyi Dyer, Williams & Bunkley-Williams, 1995, Sciadicleithrum kritskyi Bellay, Takemoto, Yamada &  Pavanelli, 2009  and Haliotrema kritskyi Vala, Maillard & Overstreet, 1982  and a species of digeneans, Lissorchis kritskyi Barnhart & Powell 1979.

References

Living people
American parasitologists
University of Idaho faculty
Year of birth missing (living people)